Minyard may refer to:

Ken Minyard (born 1939), American radio personality
Minyard Food Stores, a supermarket chain in Texas, US